The Islamic Center of Connecticut is a mosque located in Windsor, Connecticut serving the Muslim community of Hartford County.

Its Enfield cemetery is believed to be the only Islamic cemetery in New England that is meant only for Muslims.  (However, there have been separate Muslim burial plots associated with other cemeteries previously, including in Worcester, Massachusetts and Biddeford, Maine.)

See also
  List of mosques in the Americas
  Lists of mosques 
  List of mosques in the United States

References

External links
 
 Photo on Islamic Finder
 

Windsor, Connecticut
Mosques in Connecticut
Cemeteries in Hartford County, Connecticut
Buildings and structures in Hartford County, Connecticut